Dante Pereira-Olson (born August 13, 2008) is an American child actor best known for his work on You Were Never Really Here and Joker, both starring Joaquin Phoenix.

Career
After appearing in several television shows, including Last Week Tonight with John Oliver, The Slap, Jessica Jones, Happy!, and the critically acclaimed Mozart in the Jungle, Dante Pereira-Olson landed his first film role in the 2017 film You Were Never Really Here as young Joe. In 2018, he voiced Johnny Moses in the Wolverine podcast. He later gained fame when he was cast as Bruce Wayne in the 2019 film Joker. In 2020, he voiced Shanerreyus in the animated streaming series The Midnight Gospel. In 2021, he portrayed Rolf in the drama film Adopting Audrey.

Filmography

Film

Television

References

External links
 

American male television actors
American male child actors
Living people
People from Los Angeles
2008 births